Amr ibn Adi ibn Nasr ibn Rabi'a was the semi-legendary first Lakhmid king of al-Hira.

Biography
Most of the details of his life are legendary and later inventions; according to Charles Pellat, "as the historical reality of this personage and of the events [...] became blurred, legend made use of his name to fix the time of events displaced from their historical sequence, and of stories invented to explain proverbs which had become unintelligible".

According to the medieval Arab historians, Amr's father Adi gained the hand of Raqash, the favourite sister of the Tanukhid king Jadhima al-Abrash, by a ruse. Amr is said to have been abducted as a child by a jinn, before being returned to his uncle. He is then said to have been left behind as regent by Jadhima, who marched against al-Zabba (Zenobia), the queen of Palmyra. When his uncle was killed in battle, Amr vowed to avenge his death; even after Zenobia denied him this chance by committing suicide, he stabbed her corpse.

After his uncle's death, Amr broke away from Tanukhid overlordship and established the independent Lakhmid dynasty. According to the 10th-century historian al-Tabari, Amr resettled the abandoned town of al-Hira, and ruled there for 118 years—although in another place al-Tabari gives Amr's entire lifespan as 120 years—before being succeeded by his son Imru al-Qays ibn Amr as client king on behalf of the Sassanid Persians. Most medieval Arab historians agree with this, and only al-Ya'qubi gives the length of his reign as a plausible 55 years.

Amr was doubtless a historical figure, but it is difficult to establish exact facts on his reign, other than that he lived in the later 3rd century (Armand-Pierre Caussin de Perceval suggested his reign as the period 268–288). The archaeological evidence supports his existence, but is contradictory: an inscription found at al-Namara names Amr and his son, but as clients of the Roman Empire rather than the Persians, whereas the Paikuli inscription indicates that Amr was a vassal of the Sassanid king Narseh. The commonly accepted explanation is that Amr's son at some point defected to the Romans.

Manichaeism
Amr was the most prominent patron of Manichaeism, and he gave shelter to the religion and managed to convince Narseh to put an end to the persecution of the Manichaeans. However, the persecution of the Manichaeans was resumed after the death of Narseh and the Lakhmid kingdom resumed its support of the Manichaeans.

Footnotes

References

Sources 
 
 
 
 

3rd-century Arabs
3rd-century monarchs in the Middle East
Lakhmid kings
Manichaeism
Vassal rulers of the Sasanian Empire
Mythological kings